Amanda Royle (born 1962) is a British actress who has appeared in a variety of British television shows including Agatha Christie's Poirot, Campion, Rosemary & Thyme and Bulman. She is the sister of the actress Carol Royle, and their father, Derek Royle, played the part of the eponymous corpse in the Fawlty Towers episode "The Kipper and the Corpse". Derek was also the coach guide in the Beatles film "The magical Mystery Tour".

References

1962 births
British television actresses
Living people